Lars Calmfors (born 12 July 1948 in Stockholm) is a Swedish economist and professor of international economics at the Institute for International Economic Studies at Stockholm University.

He received his Ph.D. from the Stockholm School of Economics in 1978. He headed the official Swedish Government Commission on the EMU, which in 1996 recommended to wait with introducing the euro. In 2003 when Sweden held a referendum on whether to join the EMU, Calmfors advocated in favor of joining.

Calmfors has been a member of the Royal Swedish Academy of Engineering Sciences since 1993, the Royal Swedish Academy of Sciences since 1995, and a chairman of the Committee for the Prize in Economic Sciences in Memory of Alfred Nobel 1996–1998 and 2003–2007.

Between 2007 and 2011 he was the president of the Swedish Fiscal Policy Council, whose task is to evaluate Swedish economic policy.

References

External links
Calmfors' webpage at University of Stockholm

Swedish economists
Academic staff of Stockholm University
Stockholm School of Economics alumni
Members of the Royal Swedish Academy of Sciences
Members of the Royal Swedish Academy of Engineering Sciences
1948 births
Living people